The Lang Lang River is a perennial river of the Western Port catchment, located in the West Gippsland region of the Australian state of Victoria.

Location and features
The river flows generally northwest, then west, joined by one minor tributary, before reaching its river mouth and emptying into the Western Port, near the town of Lang Lang.

The river is fairly slow running and does flood occasionally with resultant disruptions to major roads like the South Gippsland Highway and Westernport Road and it can often leave residents stranded in nearby town Lang Lang.

Etymology
The exact origin of the name Lang Lang is debated.

One explanation is that it derives from the Aboriginal Boonwurrung language, in which there are two names for the river recorded: Lang Lang Berin, meaning "stones" or "stony"; and Porbin yaluk, meaning "flowing creek or river".

Other sources claim the river and town are named in honour of an early settler in region, called Lang.

See also

 List of rivers of Australia

References

External links
 
 

Melbourne Water catchment
Rivers of Greater Melbourne (region)
Rivers of Gippsland (region)
Western Port